The Women's 3 metre springboard event at the 2019 European Diving Championships was contested on 8 August.

Results
22 athletes participated at the event; the best 12 from the Preliminary round qualified for the Final.

Preliminary round

Final

References

W